Notomulciber palawanicus is a species of beetle in the family Cerambycidae. It was described by Stephan von Breuning and de Jong in 1941. It is known from the Philippines.

References

Homonoeini
Beetles described in 1941